50th Army may refer to:

 50th Army (People's Republic of China)
 Fiftieth Army (Japan)
 50th Army (Soviet Union)